David Hudson may refer to:

 David Hudson (pioneer) (1761–1836), American businessman, founder of Hudson, Ohio
 David Hudson (New York politician) (1782–1860), New York politician
 David J. Hudson (1943–2011), American sound engineer
 Dave Hudson (sailor) (born 1946), South African sailor
 Dave Hudson (born 1949), ice hockey player
 David Hudson (musician), Australian musician